Fabio Ayres (born 1 January 1991), known as Fabinho, is a Brazilian footballer who plays as a forward for Bangu.

Club career
He arrived in Italy in 2008 at Udinese and spent several years in their youth team. Afterwards he was transferred on loan to Salernitana, Modena and Perugia. In July 2014 he was acquired by Perugia.

References

External links
Fabinho at ZeroZero

1991 births
Living people
Brazilian footballers
Brazilian expatriate footballers
Association football forwards
Footballers from São Paulo (state)
People from Guarulhos
Associação Portuguesa de Desportos players
Grêmio Foot-Ball Porto Alegrense players
Sport Club Internacional players
Udinese Calcio players
U.S. Salernitana 1919 players
Modena F.C. players
A.C. Perugia Calcio players
L.R. Vicenza players
Paganese Calcio 1926 players
Clube Atlético Juventus players
Nova Iguaçu Futebol Clube players
Brusque Futebol Clube players
Esporte Clube XV de Novembro (Piracicaba) players
Hercílio Luz Futebol Clube players
Artsul Futebol Clube players
Bangu Atlético Clube players
Serie B players
Serie C players
Brazilian expatriate sportspeople in Italy
Expatriate footballers in Italy